José Eugenio "Cheche" Hernández Sarmiento (born 18 May 1956) is a Colombian football manager and former player who played as a midfielder.

Hernández played for local sides Millonarios and Deportivo Cali, and also competed in the men's tournament at the 1980 Summer Olympics. He subsequently switched to a managerial role, and was formerly a manager of the Panama and the Dominican Republic national teams, aside from managing clubs in Costa Rica, Peru and Ecuador.

References

External links

1956 births
Living people
Colombian football managers
Deportivo Cali managers
Deportes Quindío managers
Atlético Junior managers
Atlético Nacional managers
L.D. Alajuelense managers
Millonarios F.C. managers
C.D. Técnico Universitario managers
Expatriate football managers in Panama
Dominican Republic national football team managers
Colombian footballers
Association football midfielders
Olympic footballers of Colombia
Footballers at the 1980 Summer Olympics
Footballers from Bogotá
Deportivo Cali footballers
Millonarios F.C. players
Colombia international footballers
Colombian expatriate football managers
Patriotas Boyacá managers
Deportes Tolima managers
Universidad Técnica de Cajamarca managers